Packera antennariifolia, the shale barren ragwort,  is a species of the genus Packera and family Asteraceae.

It is endemic to Maryland, Pennsylvania, Virginia, and West Virginia. It is found in the Appalachian Mountains.

References

External links

antennariifolia
Flora of the Appalachian Mountains
Flora of Maryland
Flora of Pennsylvania
Flora of Virginia
Flora of West Virginia
Endemic flora of the United States
Taxa named by Nathaniel Lord Britton
Flora without expected TNC conservation status